Marjorie Delassus (born 26 March 1998) is a French slalom canoeist who has competed at the international level since 2016. She is from Pau in Béarn.

Delassus competed at the delayed 2020 Summer Olympics in Tokyo, finishing fourth in the C1 event.

At the 2020 European Championships, she won a silver medal in the K1 team event alongside Camille Prigent and Lucie Baudu. At the 2021 European Championships she won the C1 team bronze medal with Lucie Prioux and Angèle Hug. She has won a total of 4 medals (3 silvers and 1 bronze) at the European Championships.

Delassus was the World Under-23 Champion in 2019 in K1 team, European Under-23 Champion in 2018 in K1 team and in 2019 in C1 and C1 team. In 2019 she finished fourth in the C1 event at the U23 World Championships and in October 2020, she qualified for the delayed 2020 Tokyo Olympics.

In April 2021 she became the French champion on the course that is expected to be used for the 2024 Paris Olympics.

Results

World Cup individual podiums

Complete World Cup results

Notes
No overall rankings were determined by the ICF, with only two races possible due to the COVID-19 pandemic.

References

External links

Living people
1998 births
French female canoeists
Canoeists at the 2020 Summer Olympics
Olympic canoeists of France